Protororqualus is a genus of extinct rorqual from the late Pliocene (Piacenzian) of Mount Pulgnasco, Italy (: paleocoordinates ).

The analysis made by  identified Protororqualus as a late representative of the rorquals which survived in the Mediterranean at least until the late Pliocene.  This would indicate that the Mediterranean basin played a vital role in preserving primitive rorquals while more derived forms established themselves in other oceans.

Anatomy 
The Mount Pulgnasco specimen represents an early rorqual that fed differently from modern species.  Compared to the laterally bowed dentaries of the latter, its dentary is more straight, which should have made it impossible to perform the intermittent ram feeding seen in modern rorquals.  Another primitive character is that the anterior border of the supraoccipital is triangular and pointed like in Miocene Cetotheriidae.

Taxonomic history 
The type species, Protorqualus cuvierii, was originally described in 1829 as a species of Balaena, but later transferred to the Belgian genus Plesiocetus. Following synonymy of Plesiocetus with Balaenoptera, B. cuvieri was considered a species of Balaenoptera, although some authors treated it as a species of Cetotherium. Later work, however, showed that the Mount Pulgnasco skeleton was generically distinct from other fossil and extant rorquals to warrant its own genus.

References

Notes

Sources 

 

 
 

 

 

 

 
 

 

 

 

Baleen whales
Pliocene cetaceans
Pliocene mammals of Europe
Fossil taxa described in 2007
Prehistoric cetacean genera